Savangin is a prehistoric natural cave with an inscription written in an unknown or unsolved alphabet. It was found in 1995 near the village Bakırtepe, part of Artvin Province, Turkey. Along with the inscriptions, researchers found cave paintings of deer.

References

Caves of Turkey
Archaeological sites in the Black Sea Region
Landforms of Artvin Province
Geography of Artvin Province